Tales of Old Japan (1871) is an anthology of short stories compiled by Algernon Bertram Freeman-Mitford, Lord Redesdale, writing under the better known name of A.B. Mitford.  These stories focus on various aspects of Japanese life before the Meiji Restoration. The book, which was written in 1871, forms an introduction to Japanese literature and culture, both through the stories, all adapted from Japanese sources, and Mitford's supplementary notes. Also included are Mitford's eyewitness accounts of a selection of Japanese rituals, ranging from harakiri (seppuku) and marriage to a selection of sermons.

Table of contents
 The Forty-Seven rônins
 The Loves of Gompachi and Komurasaki
 Kazuma's Revenge
 A Story of the Otokodaté of Yedo
 The Wonderful Adventures of Funakoshi Jiuyémon
 The Eta Maiden and the Hatamoto
 Fairy Tales
 The Tongue-cut Sparrow
 The Accomplished and Lucky Tea-kettle
 The Crackling Mountain
 The Story of the Old Man who Made Withered Trees to Blossom
 The Battle of the Ape and the Crab
 The Adventures of Little Peachling
 The Foxes' Wedding
 The History of Sakata Kintoki
 The Elves and the Envious Neighbour
 The Ghost of Sakura
 How Tajima Shumé was Tormented by a Devil of His Own Creation
 Concerning Certain Superstitions
 The Vampire Cat of Nabéshima
 The Story of the Faithful Cat
 How a Man was Bewitched and Had His Head Shaved by the Foxes
 The Grateful Foxes
 The Badger's Money
 The Prince and the Badger
 Japanese Sermons
 The Sermons of Kiu-O, Vol. 1. Sermon 1
 The Sermons of Kiu-O, Vol. 1. Sermon 2
 The Sermons of Kiu-O, Vol. 1. Sermon 3
Appendices
 An Account of the Hari-Kiri
 The Marriage Ceremony
 The Birth and Rearing of Children
 Funeral Rites

References

 Mitford, A.B. (Algernon Bertram Freeman-Mitford, Lord Redesdale) (1871). Tales of Old Japan. London.
 
 Screech, Timon. (2006). Secret Memoirs of the Shoguns: Isaac Titsingh and Japan, 1779–1812. London: RoutledgeCurzon.

External links
Tales of Old Japan, scanned books from Project Gutenberg, Internet Archive and Google Books
 

Japanese literature
1871 anthologies
Japanese anthologies